A noun string is a term for a series of nouns or other words, all of which modify the final noun. For example, in the noun string “U.S. energy consumption” the nouns "U.S." and "energy" modify the final noun "consumption." Noun strings are frequently used in technical writing, but appear in other general business contexts as well.

As a usage problem 
Since connecting elements such as prepositions or apostrophes are omitted from noun strings, readers must infer the relationship between the words. If the string is fairly short and the reader is already familiar with the field, he or she will probably be able to interpret a noun string without too much difficulty. When strings become longer than three words, they can make readers labor. This is particularly true when the reader is not already familiar with the subject or technical domain.

Because of this problem, overly long noun strings are increasingly recognized as a problem in technical and business writing. For instance, a noun string like "Municipal Solid Waste Classification Methodology"  though not incomprehensible, is at least irritating to most readers. According to Burnett, strings of five words or more are open to several different interpretations and can be indecipherable. Because of these problems, most guides to technical writing advise writers to either limit the length of nouns strings or to avoid them altogether.

Fixing problems with noun strings 
To make long noun strings easier to understand, hyphenation can often help, as can using prepositions to show the relationship between the words, and converting the noun that hides the key action to a verb. Often, the string can be shortened by removing unnecessary words as well. Here are several examples:

See also
 Noun adjunct
 Noun phrase

External links
 http://web.uvic.ca/wguide/Pages/SentNounStr.html
 http://writing.wisc.edu/Handbook/CCS_nounstrings.html
 http://www.grammarly.com/handbook/grammar/nouns/15/noun-strings/

References 

Syntactic entities
Phrases
Grammar